Mahmoud Yousef (born 30 July 1997) is a Palestinian footballer who plays as a forward for Ihud Bnei Kafr Qara in Liga Bet. He also played for the Palestine national team since 2017.

International career 
Yousef scored the winning-goal for Palestine against India in 2016 AFC U-19 Championship qualification on 2 October 2015.

Yousef received his first international call-up for a 2019 AFC Asian Cup qualifier against Bhutan on 10 October 2017.

International goals
Scores and results list Palestine's goal tally first.

References

External links 
 
 
 

1997 births
Living people
Israeli footballers
Palestinian footballers
Palestine international footballers
Palestine youth international footballers
Association football forwards
Shabab Al-Khalil SC players
Markaz Balata players
Hapoel Kfar Saba F.C. players
Hapoel Bnei Lod F.C. players
Hapoel Bu'eine F.C. players
Hapoel Karmiel F.C. players
Ihud Bnei Kafr Qara F.C. players
Israeli Premier League players
West Bank Premier League players
Liga Leumit players
Palestinian people of Israeli descent
Footballers from Acre, Israel
Footballers at the 2018 Asian Games
Asian Games competitors for Palestine